is an economist specializing in econometrics and the economy of ancient Greece.

Amemiya is the Edward Ames Edmonds Professor of Economics (emeritus) and a Professor of Classics at Stanford University.   He is a Fellow of the Econometric Society, the American Statistical Association and the American Academy of Arts and Sciences (1985).

Education
B.A., 1958, Social Science, International Christian University, Tokyo, Japan
M.A., 1961, Economics, American University, Washington, DC
Ph.D., 1964, Economics, Johns Hopkins University, Baltimore, Maryland

Honors and awards
 U.S. Scientist Award, Alexander von Humboldt Foundation, 1988
 Fellowship, Japan Society for Promotion of Science, 1989
 Fellowship, John Simon Guggenheim Foundation, 1975–1976
 Ford Foundation Doctoral Dissertation Fellowship in Economics, Johns Hopkins University, 1963–1965

Publications

Books

Chapter in book

Selected journal articles

References

External links
Emeritus Faculty at Stanford University Department of Economics
Google Scholar

1935 births
Living people
People from Tokyo
Japanese economists
20th-century American economists
Econometricians
International Christian University alumni
American University alumni
Johns Hopkins University alumni
Stanford University Department of Economics faculty
Academic staff of Hitotsubashi University
Fellows of the Econometric Society
Fellows of the American Statistical Association
Fellows of the American Academy of Arts and Sciences
American academics of Japanese descent
Japanese emigrants to the United States